Nordstromia semililacina is a moth in the family Drepanidae. It is found in Taiwan.

The wingspan is 32–38 mm. Adults have been recorded in June.

References

Moths described in 1992
Drepaninae